Durratun Nashihin Rosli (born 17 November 1988) is a Malaysian rhythmic gymnast.

She competed at the 2006 Commonwealth Games where she won silver medals in the team, individual, clubs and rope events.

References

1988 births
Living people
Malaysian rhythmic gymnasts
Commonwealth Games medallists in gymnastics
Commonwealth Games silver medallists for Malaysia
Gymnasts at the 2006 Commonwealth Games
Medallists at the 2006 Commonwealth Games